"Stutter" is a song by American R&B singer Joe. The original version of the song was produced by Roy "Royalty" Hamilton and Teddy Riley and written by Roy "Royalty" Hamilton and Ernest E. Dixon.

A remix by Allen "Allstar" Gordon Jr. (marketed as the "Double Take Remix" due to its appearance in the 2001 film Double Take) features rapper Mystikal and was a number-one hit on the US Billboard Hot 100 for four weeks in 2001. It was one of three singles to have sold over 500,000 copies in the US in 2001.

Composition
The original is slower, more mellow and has no samples, but the remix (with its faster tempo) samples both "Summer in the City" by Quincy Jones and "Passin' Me By" by The Pharcyde.

Music video
The song and video refers to Joe's girlfriend, who comes home early in the morning while he wakes up and they discuss where she had been. She's "stuttering" because it seems she is lying to him about having an affair. Joe's close friend, portrayed by rapper Mystikal, follows and spies on her while she sleeps with another man in a motel, called the "Easy Rest-In", taping it on video. After she leaves, she and Mystikal are driving next to each other on the road, while they discuss the bad situation. Arriving home, Joe's girlfriend notes the video in their television, turning out it was her evil twin sister having that affair. Both the girlfriend and the twin sister were played by actress Natashia Williams.

Live performance
On April 10, 2001, Joe and Mystikal performed the song live at the 7th Blockbuster Entertainment Awards.

Charts and certifications

Weekly charts

Year-end charts

Certifications

|}

Release history

Cover versions
 Rock group My Darkest Days covered the song on their 2012 release Sick and Twisted Affair, and have been performing the rock version live since 2008.
 American rapper-singer Becky G covered the song in 2015 as an upload to her YouTube page with a rewritten rap added to her version instead of performing Mystikal's verse.

References

2000 songs
2001 singles
Billboard Hot 100 number-one singles
Contemporary R&B ballads
Joe (singer) songs
Song recordings produced by Teddy Riley
Songs about infidelity
Songs written by Joe (singer)
Songs written by Roy "Royalty" Hamilton
Songs written for films
Stuttering
UK Independent Singles Chart number-one singles